Sagar Ahlawat (born 30 October 1998) is an Indian boxer who competes in Super Heavyweight category. He participated in the 2022 Commonwealth Games, being awarded the silver medal in the boxing competition. The score was 5-0.

References

1998 births
Living people
Indian male boxers
Super-heavyweight boxers
Boxers at the 2022 Commonwealth Games
Commonwealth Games silver medallists for India
Commonwealth Games medallists in boxing
21st-century Indian people
Medallists at the 2022 Commonwealth Games